Pidzamochok castle is a ruined castle, dating ca 1600, located in Pidzamochok, Chortkiv Raion, Ternopil Oblast, Ukraine. Founder - Jan Zbożny (Tworowski-Buczacki).

It was built by the Tworowski-Buchacki family. It was rebuilt by the Potocki-Movile family in 16-17th century in the Renaissance style. It was a defensive structure, and saw combat several times. It fell in disrepair following its destruction by the Ottomans in the late 17th century. During the 19th century, while in the Austrian partition (following the partitions of Poland) it was partially demolished to reclaim building material. Now it is a tourist attraction the castle ruins are open to visitors.

References
  Stanisław Sławomir Nicieja, Twierdze kresowe Rzeczypospolitej, Wydawnictwo Iskry, Warszawa 2006. 
  Створено графічну реконструкцію зовнішнього вигляду зруйнованих замків Західної України 

Buildings and structures in Ternopil Oblast
Ruined castles in Ukraine
Castles in Ternopil Oblast